Theretra tessmanni is a moth of the family Sphingidae. It is known from Cameroon and Nigeria.

The wingspan is 68–80 mm for males and 80–90 mm for females. It is extremely similar to Theretra jugurtha jugurtha but the ground colour of the upperside of the body and forewings is yellowish- grey with darker greenish-grey transverse lines. Females are similar to males but larger, darker and the forewings are broader and more rounded.

References

Theretra
Moths described in 1927
Insects of Cameroon
Insects of West Africa
Moths of Africa